Neend Hamari Khwab Tumhare is a 1971 Pakistani Urdu colour film, produced and directed by Khalid Khursheed. 

It was a musical romantic drama film with music by M Ashraf and lyrics by Kaleem Usmani. The story was written by Bashir Niaz based on a story idea by Mistry Ghulam Mohammad. Its cast included Waheed Murad, Deeba, Nirala, Aliya Begum and Talish.

Cast
 Deeba
 Waheed Murad
 Aliya Begum
 Nirala
 Shahida
 A. Shah
 Zeenat
 Qavi
 Agha Talish

Film Release
Neend Hamari Khwab Tumhare was released by K.K. Pictures on 1 January 1971 in Pakistani cinemas. In spite of worst political circumstances of the country due to the 1971 India-Pakistan War, the film did well in the cinemas. It completed 15 weeks in a main cinema and 51 weeks in other cinemas of Karachi and thus became a golden jubilee film.

Film Music
The film has popular tracks "Mera Mehboob Aa Gaya" and "Naraaz Na Ho Toh Arz Karun" sung by Masood Rana. Music is composed by M Ashraf and the lyricist is Kaleem Usmani. Playback singers are Masood Rana, Runa Laila, Mehdi Hassan and Mala.

Songlist

References

External links 
 

Pakistani romantic drama films
1971 films
1970s Urdu-language films
Films scored by M Ashraf

Urdu-language Pakistani films